Goyazia is a genus of flowering plants belonging to the family Gesneriaceae.

Its native range is Brazil.

Species:

Goyazia petraea 
Goyazia rupicola

References

Gesnerioideae
Gesneriaceae genera